SAHB Stories (pronounced "Sob Stories") is the sixth studio album by The Sensational Alex Harvey Band, released in 1976. It features their hit single "Boston Tea Party", as well as a cover of the Jerry Reed song, "Amos Moses". Harvey left the band shortly after this album was released, but returned in 1977. The album was re-released in 1984 on the Sahara Records label.

Track listings
"Dance To Your Daddy" (David Batchelor, SAHB) – 5:43
"Amos Moses" (Jerry Reed) – 5:20
"Jungle Rub Out" (Batchelor, SAHB) – 4:25
"Sirocco" (Hugh McKenna) – 6:50
"Boston Tea Party" (Alex Harvey, Hugh McKenna) – 4:36
"Sultan's Choice" (Harvey, Zal Cleminson) – 4:06
"$25 for a Massage" (Harvey, Chris Glen, Cleminson) – 3:22
"Dogs of War" (Harvey, Hugh McKenna, Cleminson) – 6:10

Personnel

Sensational Alex Harvey Band
 Alex Harvey – lead vocals, guitar
 Zal Cleminson – guitar
 Chris Glen – bass guitar
 Hugh McKenna – keyboards, synthesizer
 Ted McKenna – drums

Technical
 David Batchelor – producer
 Phill Brown – engineer
 John Punter – mixing
 Gered Mankowitz — photography 
 Mike Doud – art direction

Charts

Certifications

References

The Sensational Alex Harvey Band albums
1976 albums
Vertigo Records albums